William Alexander Pickering   (9 June 1840 – 26 January 1907) was the first Protector appointed on 3 May 1877 by the British government to administer the Chinese Protectorate in colonial Singapore. He was the first European official in Singapore who could speak fluent Mandarin and Hokkien and gained the trust of many of the Singapore Chinese. His efforts went a long way towards controlling the problems posed by the secret societies then. Pickering Street in Singapore's Chinatown is named after him.

Background
Before becoming the Chinese Protector, William Pickering had previously served a 10-year term in Hong Kong's Chinese Maritime Customs Service. He could therefore speak Mandarin, the official language of Qing Government, Cantonese and a number of southern Chinese dialects such as Hakka, Hokkien, Foochew, and Teochew.

Arriving in Singapore
Once in Singapore, Pickering was appalled at how Chinese dialect translations of European officials referred to judges as "demons", police as "big dogs" and Europeans in general as "red-haired demons". There were also 'post office riots' between the Hokkiens and Teochews over who had the right to send money and letters back to China. An unusual technique he employed to quell the riots was to walk up and down the streets playing his bagpipes. This unusual sight often subdued the Chinese onlookers. Pickering, with his command of dialects, would then help to sort out the differences.

Larut Wars

Pickering played a part in putting an end to the incessant troubles between the Ghee Hin and Hai San who had engaged in open warfare over the tin fields at Larut since 1861. When Sir Andrew Clarke wished to gather together the heads of both secret societies together for a peace conference he first sent Pickering up to Penang. Pickering was to behave as if he were acting on his own responsibility. The seeds of peace thus informally sowed, Clarke could then officially invite the parties to peace talks together. Around 9 January 1874, together with McNair and Dunlop, Pickering met with Capitan China Chung Keng Quee, a person of considerable influence with the Hai San secret society.

Pickering met the famous explorer Captain Speedy in Larut, who envied him for his ability to both speak Chinese and play the bagpipes.

Chinese Protector
In 1876, an official British report into secret society activities was published. One recommendation in this report was that every coolie-to-be who arrived at Boat Quay should first encounter a British official who could speak his language and let the immigrant know that "there was an officer of the Government whose special duty is to protect and befriend him". In May 1877, William Pickering was appointed for this job under the title of "Protector of Chinese" and his office was located in a small shophouse along North Canal Road, Singapore known as the Protectorate of Chinese.

In a dramatic incident in 1887, Pickering was attacked by a Teochew carpenter, Chua Ah Siok, who was sent by one of the secret societies, the Ghee Hok Society, to kill him in retaliation for Pickering's constant meddling in business. Chua coolly walked up to Pickering's desk and threw an axe at him. The butt end of the axe blade struck Pickering on the forehead, causing serious injury, but Pickering survived.

Previously, Pickering had worked in the Chinese Imperial Maritime Customs in Fuzhou and Qing era Formosa (Taiwan), and wrote an account of his time in Taiwan called Pioneering in Formosa.

Pickering was appointed a Companion of the Order of St Michael and St George (CMG) in the 1884 Birthday Honours. He retired as Protector in 1889, due to complications from the attack by Chua, and died on 26 January 1907.

Assignment in Negeri Sembilan

Pickering was sent to Sungei Ujong, Negeri Sembilan by the British authorities in Malacca to intervene militarily in a leadership tussle in Sungai Ujong to preserve British economic interests. An agreement was eventually brokered by Pickering and the signing of the agreement was witnessed by Pickering.

References

Works cited

External links
 

Administrators in British Singapore
1840 births
1907 deaths
1870s in British Malaya
1880s in British Malaya
Companions of the Order of St Michael and St George
People from Eastwood, Nottinghamshire
British expatriates in Taiwan